The list of largest poultry slaughtering companies in Europe shows the largest companies of the poultry industry in Europe.

The list comprises companies that are all slaughtering chicken and most of them additionally other poultry such as turkey and ducks. The companies are also active in meat processing and packing as well as the production of meat products such as sausages.

List (2021) 
The following list sorts the 10 largest poultry slaughtering companies in Europe by the number of slaugthered poultry in the year 2021.

List (2018) 
The following list sorts the 11 largest poultry slaughtering companies in Europe by the number of slaugthered poultry in the year 2018.

References 

Lists of companies by industry
Meat industry
Economy-related lists of superlatives